Sanborn County is a county in the U.S. state of South Dakota. As of the 2020 census, the population was 2,330. Its county seat and largest city is Woonsocket. The county was created by the Dakota Territorial legislature on May 1, 1883, with land partitioned from Miner County. It was fully organized by July 18, 1883.

Geography
The terrain of Sanborn County consists of rolling hills, largely devoted to agriculture. The James River flows southward through the east-central part of the county, and the SW part of the country is drained by Dry Run Creek. The terrain slopes to the south and to the southeast; its highest point is in its SW corner, at 1,358' (414m) ASL.

Major highways
 South Dakota Highway 34
 South Dakota Highway 37
 South Dakota Highway 224

Adjacent counties

 Beadle County - north
 Kingsbury County - northeast
 Miner County - east
 Hanson County - southeast
 Davison County - south
 Aurora County - southwest
 Jerauld County - west

Protected areas
 McCoy Lake State Public Shooting Area

Lakes and reservoirs
 Long Lake
 Twin Lakes (partial)

Demographics

2000 census
As of the 2000 United States Census, there were 2,675 people, 1,043 households, and 732 families in the county. The population density was 5 people per square mile (2/km2). There were 1,220 housing units at an average density of 2 per square mile (1/km2). The racial makeup of the county was 98.88% White, 0.04% Black or African American, 0.30% Native American, 0.37% Asian, 0.04% Pacific Islander, 0.11% from other races, and 0.26% from two or more races. 1.01% of the population were Hispanic or Latino of any race.

There were 1,043 households, out of which 30.30% had children under the age of 18 living with them, 61.50% were married couples living together, 4.90% had a female householder with no husband present, and 29.80% were non-families. 25.40% of all households were made up of individuals, and 12.70% had someone living alone who was 65 years of age or older.  The average household size was 2.53 and the average family size was 3.07.

The county population contained 25.70% under the age of 18, 7.70% from 18 to 24, 23.70% from 25 to 44, 23.40% from 45 to 64, and 19.50% who were 65 years of age or older. The median age was 41 years. For every 100 females there were 107.20 males. For every 100 females age 18 and over, there were 104.70 males.

The median income for a household in the county was $33,375, and the median income for a family was $38,256. Males had a median income of $25,951 versus $18,482 for females. The per capita income for the county was $18,301. About 11.00% of families and 14.90% of the population were below the poverty line, including 22.10% of those under age 18 and 14.30% of those age 65 or over.

2010 census
As of the 2010 United States Census, there were 2,355 people, 975 households, and 630 families in the county. The racial makeup of the county was 98.0% white, 0.3% American Indian, 0.2% Asian, 0.6% from other races, and 1.1% from two or more races. Those of Hispanic or Latino origin made up 1.2% of the population. In terms of ancestry,

Of the 975 households, 24.2% had children under the age of 18 living with them, 55.0% were married couples living together, 6.3% had a female householder with no husband present, 35.4% were non-families, and 31.1% of all households were made up of individuals. The average household size was 2.24 and the average family size was 2.79. The median age was 47.1 years.

The median income for a household in the county was $44,732 and the median income for a family was $56,304. Males had a median income of $32,361 versus $23,724 for females. The per capita income for the county was $21,055. About 7.7% of families and 12.7% of the population were below the poverty line, including 21.4% of those under age 18 and 15.1% of those age 65 or over.

Communities

City
 Woonsocket (county seat)

Towns
 Artesian
 Letcher

Census-designated place
 Forestburg
 Upland Colony

Unincorporated community
 Cuthbert

Townships

 Afton
 Benedict
 Butler
 Diana
 Elliott
 Floyd
 Jackson
 Letcher
 Logan
 Oneida
 Ravenna
 Silver Creek
 Twin Lake
 Union
 Warren
 Woonsocket

Politics
Sanborn County has been a swing county in the past, but in recent decades has tended to vote Republican. In 64% of the national elections since 1960, the county selected the Republican Party candidate (as of 2020).

See also
 National Register of Historic Places listings in Sanborn County, South Dakota

References

 
1883 establishments in Dakota Territory
Populated places established in 1883